The National Partnership for Women & Families is a nonprofit, nonpartisan 501(c)3 organization based in Washington, D.C. Founded in 1971, the National Partnership works on public policies, education and outreach that focuses on women and families.

History
The National Partnership for Women & Families was known as the Women's Legal Defense Fund (WLDF) until 1998.

Judith L. Lichtman was hired as the National Partnership's first paid staff member in 1974. Lichtman became president in 1988 and served in the role for 16 years. Lichtman is currently the organization's senior advisor.

The current president, Debra L. Ness, joined the National Partnership as executive vice president in 1991 and assumed the role of president in 2004.

The organization is best known for its work to build support for, pass, protect and expand the Family and Medical Leave Act – the first and only national law guaranteeing eligible workers job-protected, unpaid leave to care for a newborn or newly adopted child, seriously ill family member, or to recover from their own serious health conditions.

Issues & Campaigns
The National Partnership works on four main issues:

 Health care – increasing access, improving quality and ensuring the affordability of health care
 Reproductive rights – ensuring women have access to the full range of reproductive health services
 Workplace fairness – expanding and restoring civil rights protections that promote equal opportunity and justice in the workplace and society
 Family friendly workplace policies – expanding workers' access to job-protected paid sick days, paid family and medical leave, flex-time, and more

Current projects include a national paid sick days campaign, the Campaign for Better Care, and the Americans for Quality Health Care initiative. The National Partnership provides technical support to Aligning Forces for Quality (AF4Q), a project of the Robert Wood Johnson Foundation.

Impact and Achievements
In 1977, the National Partnership litigated and achieved a significant victory in Barnes v. Costle, a U.S. Court of Appeals decision that held that any retaliation by a boss against an employee for rejecting sexual advances violates Title VII's prohibition against sex discrimination.

Laws the National Partnership helped enact include: the Pregnancy Discrimination Act of 1978, the Civil Rights Act of 1991, the Family and Medical Leave Act of 1993 and the Health Insurance Portability and Accountability Act of 1996, as well as national child support reforms in 1988.

In 2009, the National Partnership helped lead efforts to create the Lilly Ledbetter Fair Pay Act of 2009 and the Children's Health Insurance Program Reauthorization Act of 2009. The foundation also worked on reversing the global gag rule, and adding clauses to the American Recovery and Reinvestment Act of 2009.

The National Partnership provided technical assistance and expert testimony in support of the 2010 Patient Protection and Affordable Care Act.

The National Partnership also works on city and state level campaigns and has driven or supported efforts to enact paid sick days laws in San Francisco (2006), the District of Columbia (2008) and the state of Connecticut (2011), as well as paid family leave laws in the states of California (2002), Washington (2007) and New Jersey (2008).

In 2011, the organization won the Convio Innovator Award for Best Online Campaign.

Notable Supporters
First Lady Michelle Obama is a two-time speaker at National Partnership events. In 2011, she said that the National Partnership is "one of the most influential organizations for women and families in our country," and has had an "amazing imprint on nearly every single one of this nation's major policy achievements for women and families."

Secretary of State and former First Lady Hillary Clinton has been twice honored by the National Partnership, in 1994 and 2012. In 2012 she said of the National Partnership, "For more than 40 years, you've been protecting the most vulnerable among us and holding us all to account when we are not living up to our own American values. And in the process, you improve the lives of countless women and help make that future a better place for them and their children."

Previous speakers at National Partnership events include: former President Bill Clinton, former Vice President Al Gore, former Secretary of State Madeleine Albright, journalists Christiane Amanpour and Ellen Goodman, historian and author Doris Kearns Goodwin, media artists Allison Janney, Anna Deavere Smith, Rob Reiner, and Rosie O'Donnell, activist Marian Wright Edelman, and UNICEF Director Carol Bellamy.

Notes

External links

 Official website 

Organizations established in 1971
Women's political advocacy groups in the United States
Women's organizations based in the United States
Abortion-rights organizations in the United States
Feminist organizations in the United States
Women in Washington, D.C.